Tanweer Ahmed (born January 1, 1969) is a Pakistani businessman, investor, entrepreneur, and philanthropist. Tanweer is the owner of the Prairie View Cricket Complex the current largest cricket complex in Houston, Texas. He is the founder of a brand of food chains and North Coast Couriers, the largest transportation company in California. He is also the owner of Houston Hurricanes cricket franchise.

Career 
Tanweer was born in Sialkot, Pakistan, and moved to the US in 1988 where he started the restaurant business. Tanweer started the restaurant and transport business in the US. Tanweer is the CEO of PAK Foods. He is an early investor in the USA Cricket-sanctioned Major League Cricket tournament set to start play in 2023.

References

External links
Tanweer Ahmed official website
Hussain Dawood Pledge official website

1969 births
People from Houston
Living people
Pakistani investors
Pakistani venture capitalists
Pakistani chief executives
Punjabi people
People from Sialkot
Pakistani company founders
Pakistani industrialists
Pakistani philanthropists